The Miss Universo Italia 2003  pageant was held on January 31, 2003. The chosen winner represented Italy at the Miss Universe 2003.

Results
Miss Universo Italia 2003 : Silvia Ceccon 
1st Runner Up : Anna Gigli Molinari

External links
 http://missuniverse.notizie.alice.it/index.html?pmk=notmuinav

Miss Universo Italia
2003 beauty pageants
2003 in Italy